The Departmental Council of Maine-et-Loire is the deliberative assembly of the Maine-et-Loire department in the region of Pays de la Loire. It consists of 42 members (general councilors) from 21 cantons and its headquarters are in Angers.

The President of the General Council is Florence Dabin.

Vice-Presidents 
The President of the Departmental Council is assisted by 12 vice-presidents chosen from among the departmental councilors. Each of them has a delegation of authority.

See also 
 Maine-et-Loire
 General councils of France

References 

Maine-et-Loire
Maine-et-Loire